The Edsel Show is an hour-long television special broadcast live on CBS in the United States on October 13, 1957, intended to promote Ford Motor Company's new Edsel cars. It was a milestone in the long career of entertainer Bing Crosby and is notable as the first CBS entertainment program to be recorded on videotape for rebroadcast in the western part of the country following a live   performance for the east coast.  Crosby arranged for this ‘live’ program to be ‘produced’ by his alma mater Gonzaga University in order that the profits (estimated at $250,000) could go to them in a tax efficient way. The program won the ‘Look’ magazine TV Award for ‘Best Musical Show’  and was nominated for an Emmy as the “Best Single Program of the Year”.

Overview
The Edsel Show starred Bing Crosby and featured Frank Sinatra, Rosemary Clooney, Louis Armstrong, and Lindsay Crosby, Bing's son, performing with the Four Preps. It also featured an appearance by a "mystery guest", comedian Bob Hope. The show was directed by Seymour Berns, and was written and produced by Bill Morrow. The Orchestra was directed by Toots Camarata. Musical supervision by Buddy Cole with additional arrangements by John Scott Trotter.

During the show's opening musical number, Now You Has Jazz, Crosby introduces each member of the Armstrong band prior to a brief solo from all. In order: Edmond Hall on clarinet, Trummy Young on trombone, Billy Kyle on piano, Squire Gersh on double bass, and Barrett Deems on drums. Crosby and Armstrong and his band had performed the same song in the 1956 motion picture High Society.

CBS pre-empted its regular Ford sponsored hour in the Sunday 8pm EST slot, The Ed Sullivan Show, for one evening only. One of the 1957-58 television season's most successful outings, its popularity did not transfer to sales in the Edsel line of automobiles.

Following his three decades as a highly successful recording artist, Academy Award-winning film actor and highly rated weekly network radio star, this special  has been credited as Bing Crosby's true breakthrough into the medium of television. It set the pattern for his many television specials to come; in its wake he signed a lucrative contract with ABC under which he would produce two specials per year.

Soundtrack
"Now You Has Jazz" Bing Crosby and Louis Armstrong
 "Medley" Bing Crosby and Frank Sinatra
"Road To Morocco" Bing Crosby, Frank Sinatra and Bob Hope                                                                          
"I Guess I'll Have to Change My Plan" Rosemary Clooney
"Boola Boola" The Four Preps
"Medley" Bing Crosby and Frank Sinatra
"In the Middle of an Island" Lindsay Crosby
"The Birth of the Blues" Frank Sinatra and Louis Armstrong
"Medley" Bing Crosby, Frank Sinatra and Rosemary Clooney
"On the Sunny Side of the Street" Bing Crosby, Frank Sinatra, Rosemary Clooney and Louis Armstrong

Reception
Variety magazine was impressed.  “The Edsel Show, a special kick-off for Ford’s new line of cars on tv, was a smooth, fast ride all the way. In fact, without even seeming to try, it shaped up as one of video’s top musical offerings, in the same class as the Mary Martin-Ethel Merman layout several years ago, on the ‘Ford Jubilee’ show. This time, it was the tandem of Bing Crosby and Frank Sinatra, two savvy pros who were at the top of their form. For Crosby, it was his best tv showing to date and for those who remember live radio way back when, Der Bingle generated the same easy charm that was responsible for his long-time run on the AM kilocycles...Crosby’s number with Armstrong and his combo on ‘Now You Has Jazz’ was a crackerjack getaway."

The show had a Trendex rating of 40.8. (A Trendex rating represents the percentage of TV homes in fifteen major cities, including New York, that are tuned to the program specified. Trendex telephoned 1000 homes during each half-hour period.)

Videotape
The show was performed at CBS Television City in the afternoon in California and broadcast live in the eastern part of the country. A videotape was made of the performance and was played back three hours later for western audiences. As videotape was a new technology, CBS made a film-based kinescope of the show and played it back alongside the videotape, so that the broadcast could switch to the kinescope if problems were encountered with the tape; there were none.

Videotape was a technology that had interested Crosby for several years. His company, Bing Crosby Enterprises, had investigated several technologies, ultimately investing in Ampex, the first company to demonstrate a practical broadcast-quality videotape system when it unveiled the first 2" Quadruplex videotape machine in 1956. Crosby's interest as a performer was to avoid   repeated live performances of the same show for west coast broadcast, the routine on early live network radio. Videotape use on a regular basis was first introduced on the CBS News series Douglas Edwards and the News in November 1956. Today, with no known tape copies of those telecasts in the CBS library or tapes of any programming prior to the fall of 1957, The Edsel Show is believed to be the earliest surviving videotaped television broadcast.

In popular culture
In her autobiography, Girl Singer (Doubleday, 1999), Rosemary Clooney recalled an incident that happened the afternoon of The Edsel Show'''s telecast:

See also
1957 in televisionAn Evening With Fred Astaire''

References

External links
 A page about the show featuring a short clip
 From the same site, about the discovery of the master videotape
 Another clip showing various Edsel models
 
 

1950s American television specials
Black-and-white American television shows
CBS original programming
English-language television shows
1957 television specials
1957 in American television